Bertram Markus (4 October 1899 – 1 April 1960) was a Canadian fencer. He competed in three events at the 1932 Summer Olympics.

References

1899 births
1960 deaths
Canadian male fencers
Olympic fencers of Canada
Fencers at the 1932 Summer Olympics
Sportspeople from Pembroke, Ontario